Braben is a surname. Notable people with the surname include:

David Braben (born 1964), British video game developer and designer
Donald Braben (born 1935), English writer
Eddie Braben (1930–2013), British comedy writer and performer

See also
Raben